Sawmills are facilities where logs are cut to length.

Sawmills may also refer to:

 Sawmills Studios, a famous UK music recording studio
 Sawmills, North Carolina

See also

Sawmill (disambiguation)